Old Dutch Church Parsonage (also known as Cornelius Masten Stone House; Julia Dillon House) is a historic home located at 109 Pearl Street in Kingston, Ulster County, New York. It was built in 1725, in the Colonial and Dutch Colonial Revival architectural styles.  It is a -story rubblestone dwelling with frame wings added in 1919.

It was added to the National Register of Historic Places in 2001.

References

Reformed Church in America churches in New York (state)
Houses on the National Register of Historic Places in New York (state)
Houses completed in 1725
Churches in Ulster County, New York
Colonial Revival architecture in New York (state)
Dutch Colonial Revival architecture in the United States
Clergy houses in the United States
1725 establishments in the Province of New York
National Register of Historic Places in Ulster County, New York